Saoirse is an Irish female given name which became popular in Ireland in the 1920s.

People named Saoirse 
Saoirse Ronan (born 1994), Irish and American actress
Saoirse Noonan (born 1999), Irish footballer
Saoirse-Monica Jackson (born 1993), Northern Irish actress

Characters named Saoirse 
 Saoirse, a little girl in the 2014 film Song of the Sea
 Saoirse, a guardian spirit in the 2017 videogame Nioh
 Saoirse, a woman in "Natural Justice", the first episode of the Irish television series Single-Handed.

See also
List of Irish-language given names

References

Irish-language feminine given names